Glee: The Music Presents Glease is the fifth extended play (EP) by the cast of the musical series Glee. It was released on November 6, 2012, and contains covers of nine songs from the 1971 musical, Grease, and from the film based on it.

Track listing

References

2012 soundtrack albums
Columbia Records EPs
Glee (TV series) albums
Grease (musical)